Rudno nad Hronom is a village and municipality in the Žarnovica District, Banská Bystrica Region in Slovakia.

References

External links

Villages and municipalities in Žarnovica District